Berwyn (styled BERWYN, full name Berwyn Du Bois) is a Trinidad-born rapper, producer, and songwriter, who is now based in East London.

Early life
BERWYN was born in Trinidad and moved to Romford, east London at the age of nine. His father was a bus driver and his mother a youth worker. According to BERWYN, his father has also worked as a DJ, and his family were "always musical". BERWYN attended the Royal Liberty School, where he was inspired by his music teacher who would take him to a folk club. BERWYN stated that he is still into folk music. Due to his uncertain immigration status, BERWYN was unable to go to university despite earning adequate grades and also struggled to find work. This was a factor in pursuing a career in music. BERWYN previously worked at a Subway franchise in a hospital.

Career
BERWYN's debut mixtape, DEMOTAPE/VEGA was released on 25 September 2020, though it was written in two weeks in 2018.

In late 2020, BERWYN was placed third in the BBC Sound Of 2021 list.

In late 2021, his mixtape DEMOTAPE/VEGA was shortlisted for the Hyundai Mercury Prize album of the year. He became beneficiary of a recent rule change to the Mercury, that allows people who have been resident in the UK or Ireland for more than five years to be eligible. The change was made after a 2020 protest by Japanese-British pop singer Rina Sawayama, whose debut album was deemed ineligible because she did not have a British passport.

In November 2021, BERWYN was nominated for 'Best Newcomer' at the MOBO Awards.

Discography

Mixtapes 
 DEMOTAPE/VEGA (25 September 2020)
 TAPE 2/FOMALHAUT (18 June 2021)

Singles 
 "GLORY" (7 May 2020)
 "TRAP PHONE" (16 July 2020)
 "017 FREESTYLE" (22 September 2020)
"VINYL" (25 November 2020)
"100,000,000" (9 April 2021)
"I'D RATHER DIE THAN BE DEPORTED“ (28 April 2021)
"RUBBER BANDS" (11 May 2021)
"TO BE LOVED" (18 June 2021)
"MIA" (10 November 2021)

References

Living people
Musicians from London
Year of birth missing (living people)